The Râmnicul Sărat or Râmnicu Sărat is a right tributary of the river Siret in Romania. It discharges into the Siret in Belciugele. Its upper course, above the confluence with the Martin, is sometimes called Mălușel.

Towns and villages

The following towns and villages are situated along the river Râmnicul Sărat, from source to mouth: Jitia, Jitia de Jos, Luncile, Tulburea, Chiojdeni, Dumitreștii de Sus, Dumitrești, Biceștii de Jos, Mucești-Dănulești, Alexandru Odobescu, Buda, Toropălești, Ceairu, Gura Făgetului, Dedulești, Băbeni, Tăbăcari, Răducești, Oratia, Podgoria, Poșta, Râmnicu Sărat, Valea Râmnicului, Rubla, Râmnicelu, Colibași, Știubei, Fotin, Lunca, Plopi, Puieștii de Sus, Măcrina, Puieștii de Jos, Nicolești, Dăscălești, Codrești, Spătăreasa, Ciorăști, Mihălceni, Salcia Veche, Vâjâitoarea, Tătăranu, Râmniceni, Tătaru, Belciugele and Măicănești.

Tributaries

The following rivers are tributaries to the river Râmnicul Sărat (from source to mouth):

Left: Sărățel, Cerbu, Râmnicel, Săritoarea, Tulburea, Rotăria, Motnău, Căprăria, Bădila, Mocanca, Coțatcu, Bălan

Right: Martin, Moldoveanul (or Recea), Ulmușor (or Pârâul Sărat), Râul Vacii Rele, Cătăuț, Buda, Izvorul Pietrelor, Băbeni, Muncelu, Greabăn, Putreda

References

Rivers of Romania
Rivers of Buzău County
Rivers of Vrancea County
Rivers of Galați County